The Hunger is the first album of the band Seven Day Jesus. It was released in 1996.

Track listing
All songs written by Brian McSweeney, except where noted.
 "A Time to Heal" - 3:35
 "Strength" - 3:46
 "Flybye" - 5:02
 "Forgive Me" - 4:45
 "Forgive You" - 4:16
 "Pavement" - 3:59
 "The Hunger" - 3:23
 "Restrained" - 5:04
 "Delightful You" - 4:15
 "Ashamed" - 4:43

Personnel
 Brian McSweeney
 Matt Sumpter
 Wes Simpkins
 Chris Beaty
 Russ Fox
 Kevin Adkins

References

1999 albums
Seven Day Jesus albums